Rivercess may refer to:
Rivercess County, Liberia
River Cess, capital of Rivercess County